The Fire Museum of Memphis is located in Fire Engine House No. 1 on 118 Adams Avenue in Memphis, Tennessee, USA. In the heart of downtown Memphis, the FMOM (Fire Museum of Memphis) is considered the premiere fire museum in the country, dedicated to documenting and promoting the local history of fire fighting and educating the public in fire and life safety. The FMOM hosts fire departments both nationally and internationally in their quest to emulate their success.  Working with the University of Memphis to validate their Fire Prevention Public Education Curriculum, the Fire Museum of Memphis is the first of its kind to capture data, testing their Fire Prevention effectiveness.  Local schools are offered free admission with bus transportation reimbursement, drastically impacting a fire fatality rate that was two and one half times the national average when the museum opened in October, 1998.  The museum provides interactive exhibits as well as video documentation. In 2014, the museum underwent 1.5 million dollars in renovations.

Exhibits
The Fire Museum of Memphis is located in the Fire Engine House No. 1, which was built in 1910. Historic exhibits in the museum date back to the late 1800s and early 1900s. Several historic fire engines that were used by the Memphis Fire Department are on display at the museum.

 1910 Crump Steamer
 1912 American LaFrance
 1929 American LaFrance Pumper 

Other exhibits consist of antique fire fighting equipment, historic uniforms, American and European Firefighter's helmets, badges, lanterns, antique fire fighting toys and fire engine scale models. A fire simulation room safely demonstrates the development of a fire in a residence where visitors feel the heat in the midst of the flames. The simulation recreates the experience of being in a burning house. Video stations document the history of the Memphis Fire Department and the "Great Fires of Memphis." A model of the Fire Station No. 1, in which today's museum is housed, shows the station as it was in 1910. An Arcade Room allows children to play specially developed fire and life safety video games.  Outside of the museum, a memorial wall is dedicated to the Memphis fire fighters who have died in the line of duty. 

Children of all ages can experience playing on and with authentic fire equipment, (simulated) driving to the scene of a fire and/or medical call. A crew cabin of an E-One fire truck can be explored and played on by children, as well as an authentic ambulance unit and a Ward-LaFrance Pumper. Children can experience the thrill of a snorkel ride in an aerial platform, slide down a fireman's brass pole or practice crawling through an escape maze to get to their Family Meeting Place.  They can also meet Ol' Billy, an animatronics talking horse, who shares first hand, the history of the Memphis Fire Department, and the only horse to retire from the Memphis Fire Department.  

The museum is open from Monday to Saturday from 9 am to 4:30 pm and 1-4:30 pm on Sundays.  The museum is a popular venue for children's birthday parties and special events.
Admission is $10 for adults, $8 for children.  2 and under admitted free.   $8 for Seniors and Military

See also
 Fire safety
 Fire station
 List of museums in Tennessee

References

External links
Fire Museum of Memphis - official site
 Virtual tours (360 degree view) through the Fire Museum of Memphis
 Google Maps street view of the entrance of the Fire Museum of Memphis

Museums in Memphis, Tennessee
Fire stations in Tennessee
Firefighting museums in the United States
History museums in Tennessee
Museums established in 1998
1998 establishments in Tennessee